East Aurora Union Free School District is a school district in East Aurora, New York, United States. The superintendent is Brian Russ. The district operates three schools: East Aurora High School, East Aurora Middle School, and Parkdale Elementary School.

Administration
The district offices are located at 430 Main Street. The current superintendent is Brian Russ.

Selected former superintendents 
Previous assignment and previous assignment denoted in parentheses
Walter L. Bumgardner–?-1961 (Principal - East Aurora High School, retired)
Clarence M. Green–1961-1965
William T. Crocoli–1965-?
Philip M. Martin
Thomas Fower-Finn
Merton L. Haynes [interim]–1992-1993 (Interim Superintendent - Grand Island Central School District, named Interim Superintendent of West Seneca Central School District)
Robert B. Fort–1989-1997  (unknown, retired)
Howard S. Smith–1997-2004 (unknown, named Superintendent of Williamsville Central School District)
James C. Bodziak–2004-2011 (Assistant Superintendent of Curriculum and Instruction - Orchard Park Central School District, named Superintendent of Frontier Central School District)

East Aurora High School

East Aurora High School is located at 1003 Center Street and serves grades 9 through 12. The current principal is William Roberts.

History
East Aurora High School was housed at the Main Street School until 1971, when the current building opened on Center Street.

Former principals
Previous assignment and previous assignment denoted in parentheses
Harold W. Mead–1927-1933 (Teacher - East Aurora Union Free School, named Superintendent of East Aurora Union Free School District)
 Walter L. Bumgardner–1927-1933 (unknown, named Superintendent of East Aurora Union Free School District)
Joseph E. Barber
Thomas C. Moore–1946-1961 (Principal - Salamanca High School, retired)
H. Lewis McNeil–1961-1962
R. Bruce MacPherson–1962-1964 (Administrative Assistant - East Aurora Junior-Senior High School, resigned)
Donald J. Lawson–1964-1984 (Principal - East Aurora Junior High School, retired)
James L. Hoagland–1984-2017 (Assistant Principal - Woodstock High School, retired)

East Aurora Middle School

East Aurora Middle School is located at 430 Main Street and serves grades 5 through 8. The current principal is Matthew Brown.

Parkdale Elementary School

Parkdale Elementary is located at 141 Girard Avenue and serves grades K through 4. The current principal is Jessica Lyons.

History
Parkdale Elementary School was opened in 1970.

References

External links
Official site

Education in Erie County, New York
School districts in New York (state)